The 1984–85 Pittsburgh Penguins season was the team's 18th in the National Hockey League. It marked the debut of Mario Lemieux for the Penguins. Lemieux debuted on October 11, 1984, against the Boston Bruins and scored a goal with his very first NHL shot, on his first shift. Later that season, Lemieux played in the NHL All-Star Game and became the first rookie to be named the All-Star Game's Most Valuable Player. Despite missing seven games during the season, Lemieux scored 100 points and won the Calder Memorial Trophy as the rookie of the year.

Offseason

Before the 1984 NHL Entry Draft, Lemieux announced he wanted to play for whoever drafted him. He and his agent were deadlocked with the Penguins and could not negotiate a contract. Because of this, when the Penguins called his name as the first overall draft pick, he did not shake general manager Eddie Johnston's hand or don the Penguins jersey, as is NHL tradition. He claimed he was upset about the contract negotiation, and said that "Pittsburgh doesn't want [him] bad enough." Even though the draft was held in Montreal, over 3,000 fans viewed a broadcast in Pittsburgh's Civic Arena — a typical Penguins game drew less than 7,000 fans at the time. Lemieux's actions upset many fans and led to accusations of arrogance and aloofness. After the draft, Johnston signed Lemieux to a two-year contract for $600,000, plus a $150,000 bonus for signing.  Although Lemieux wore the jersey #27 during his time with the Laval Voisins, he wanted to adopt Wayne Gretzky's #99 when he entered the NHL.  However, his agent advised him to create his own identity; thus, Lemieux turned #99 upside down and landed on #66, which stuck with him throughout his career.

Regular season

Season standings

Schedule and results

|- style="background:#fcf;"
| 1 || Oct 11 || Pittsburgh Penguins || 3–4 || Boston Bruins || Boston Garden || 0–1–0 || 0
|- style="background:#fcf;"
| 2 || Oct 13 || Pittsburgh Penguins || 3–4 || Montreal Canadiens || Montreal Forum || 0–2–0 || 0
|- style="background:#cfc;"
| 3 || Oct 17 || Vancouver Canucks || 3–4 || Pittsburgh Penguins || Civic Arena || 1–2–0 || 2
|- style="background:#cfc;"
| 4 || Oct 20 || Philadelphia Flyers || 1–3 || Pittsburgh Penguins || Civic Arena || 2–2–0 || 4
|- style="background:#fcf;"
| 5 || Oct 21 || Pittsburgh Penguins || 2–4 || Philadelphia Flyers || The Spectrum || 2–3–0 || 4
|- style="background:#fcf;"
| 6 || Oct 24 || New Jersey Devils || 5–2 || Pittsburgh Penguins || Civic Arena || 2–4–0 || 4
|- style="background:#cfc;"
| 7 || Oct 27 || Montreal Canadiens || 5–6 || Pittsburgh Penguins || Civic Arena || 3–4–0 || 6
|- style="background:#cfc;"
| 8 || Oct 30 || Detroit Red Wings || 3–4 || Pittsburgh Penguins || Civic Arena || 4–4–0 || 8
|- style="background:#cfc;"
| 9 || Oct 31 || Pittsburgh Penguins || 7–6 || New Jersey Devils || Brendan Byrne Arena || 5–4–0 || 10
|-

|- style="background:#fcf;"
| 10 || Nov 3 || New York Rangers || 7–5 || Pittsburgh Penguins || Civic Arena || 5–5–0 || 10
|- style="background:#ffc;"
| 11 || Nov 6 || Edmonton Oilers || 3–3 OT || Pittsburgh Penguins || Civic Arena || 5–5–1 || 11
|- style="background:#fcf;"
| 12 || Nov 8 || St. Louis Blues || 6–2 || Pittsburgh Penguins || Civic Arena || 5–6–1 || 11
|- style="background:#fcf;"
| 13 || Nov 10 || Pittsburgh Penguins || 4–5 || New York Islanders || Nassau Veterans Memorial Coliseum || 5–7–1 || 11
|- style="background:#cfc;"
| 14 || Nov 14 || Pittsburgh Penguins || 4–3 OT || Winnipeg Jets || Winnipeg Arena || 6–7–1 || 13
|- style="background:#fcf;"
| 15 || Nov 16 || Pittsburgh Penguins || 6–7 || Vancouver Canucks || Pacific Coliseum || 6–8–1 || 13
|- style="background:#fcf;"
| 16 || Nov 17 || Pittsburgh Penguins || 3–5 || Los Angeles Kings || The Forum || 6–9–1 || 13
|- style="background:#ffc;"
| 17 || Nov 21 || Washington Capitals || 3–3 OT || Pittsburgh Penguins || Civic Arena || 6–9–2 || 14
|- style="background:#fcf;"
| 18 || Nov 22 || Pittsburgh Penguins || 3–9 || Hartford Whalers || Hartford Civic Center || 6–10–2 || 14
|- style="background:#fcf;"
| 19 || Nov 24 || New Jersey Devils || 5–3 || Pittsburgh Penguins || Civic Arena || 6–11–2 || 14
|- style="background:#ffc;"
| 20 || Nov 27 || Buffalo Sabres || 2–2 OT || Pittsburgh Penguins || Civic Arena || 6–11–3 || 15
|- style="background:#fcf;"
| 21 || Nov 29 || Chicago Black Hawks || 6–3 || Pittsburgh Penguins || Civic Arena || 6–12–3 || 15
|-

|- style="background:#fcf;"
| 22 || Dec 1 || Pittsburgh Penguins || 1–3 || Philadelphia Flyers || The Spectrum || 6–13–3 || 15
|- style="background:#fcf;"
| 23 || Dec 2 || Pittsburgh Penguins || 1–9 || Washington Capitals || Capital Centre || 6–14–3 || 15
|- style="background:#cfc;"
| 24 || Dec 5 || St. Louis Blues || 4–7 || Pittsburgh Penguins || Civic Arena || 7–14–3 || 17
|- style="background:#cfc;"
| 25 || Dec 7 || Pittsburgh Penguins || 4–3 OT || New York Rangers || Madison Square Garden (IV) || 8–14–3 || 19
|- style="background:#cfc;"
| 26 || Dec 8 || Calgary Flames || 4–6 || Pittsburgh Penguins || Civic Arena || 9–14–3 || 21
|- style="background:#cfc;"
| 27 || Dec 12 || New York Islanders || 3–4 || Pittsburgh Penguins || Civic Arena || 10–14–3 || 23
|- style="background:#cfc;"
| 28 || Dec 15 || Pittsburgh Penguins || 5–2 || Toronto Maple Leafs || Maple Leaf Gardens || 11–14–3 || 25
|- style="background:#fcf;"
| 29 || Dec 19 || New Jersey Devils || 3–2 || Pittsburgh Penguins || Civic Arena || 11–15–3 || 25
|- style="background:#cfc;"
| 30 || Dec 21 || Philadelphia Flyers || 2–4 || Pittsburgh Penguins || Civic Arena || 12–15–3 || 27
|- style="background:#fcf;"
| 31 || Dec 22 || Pittsburgh Penguins || 2–5 || New York Islanders || Nassau Veterans Memorial Coliseum || 12–16–3 || 27
|- style="background:#cfc;"
| 32 || Dec 26 || New York Islanders || 5–6 || Pittsburgh Penguins || Civic Arena || 13–16–3 || 29
|- style="background:#cfc;"
| 33 || Dec 28 || Hartford Whalers || 0–4 || Pittsburgh Penguins || Civic Arena || 14–16–3 || 31
|- style="background:#fcf;"
| 34 || Dec 29 || Pittsburgh Penguins || 2–10 || Quebec Nordiques || Colisée de Québec || 14–17–3 || 31
|- style="background:#ffc;"
| 35 || Dec 31 || Pittsburgh Penguins || 4–4 OT || Detroit Red Wings || Joe Louis Arena || 14–17–4 || 32
|-

|- style="background:#cfc;"
| 36 || Jan 2 || Pittsburgh Penguins || 2–1 || Toronto Maple Leafs || Maple Leaf Gardens || 15–17–4 || 34
|- style="background:#fcf;"
| 37 || Jan 4 || Pittsburgh Penguins || 2–7 || Buffalo Sabres || Buffalo Memorial Auditorium || 15–18–4 || 34
|- style="background:#fcf;"
| 38 || Jan 5 || Quebec Nordiques || 8–3 || Pittsburgh Penguins || Civic Arena || 15–19–4 || 34
|- style="background:#cfc;"
| 39 || Jan 9 || Vancouver Canucks || 4–7 || Pittsburgh Penguins || Civic Arena || 16–19–4 || 36
|- style="background:#cfc;"
| 40 || Jan 12 || Edmonton Oilers || 3–4 || Pittsburgh Penguins || Civic Arena || 17–19–4 || 38
|- style="background:#fcf;"
| 41 || Jan 16 || Washington Capitals || 5–4 || Pittsburgh Penguins || Civic Arena || 17–20–4 || 38
|- style="background:#fcf;"
| 42 || Jan 17 || Pittsburgh Penguins || 2–6 || Washington Capitals || Capital Centre || 17–21–4 || 38
|- style="background:#cfc;"
| 43 || Jan 19 || Chicago Black Hawks || 4–5 || Pittsburgh Penguins || Civic Arena || 18–21–4 || 40
|- style="background:#fcf;"
| 44 || Jan 21 || Pittsburgh Penguins || 6–7 || Winnipeg Jets || Winnipeg Arena || 18–22–4 || 40
|- style="background:#fcf;"
| 45 || Jan 23 || Pittsburgh Penguins || 3–4 || Minnesota North Stars || Met Center || 18–23–4 || 40
|- style="background:#ffc;"
| 46 || Jan 25 || Pittsburgh Penguins || 6–6 OT || Calgary Flames || Olympic Saddledome || 18–23–5 || 41
|- style="background:#fcf;"
| 47 || Jan 26 || Pittsburgh Penguins || 3–6 || Edmonton Oilers || Northlands Coliseum || 18–24–5 || 41
|- style="background:#fcf;"
| 48 || Jan 30 || Toronto Maple Leafs || 6–5 || Pittsburgh Penguins || Civic Arena || 18–25–5 || 41
|-

|- style="background:#fcf;"
| 49 || Feb 2 || New York Islanders || 4–0 || Pittsburgh Penguins || Civic Arena || 18–26–5 || 41
|- style="background:#fcf;"
| 50 || Feb 7 || Pittsburgh Penguins || 3–6 || New Jersey Devils || Brendan Byrne Arena || 18–27–5 || 41
|- style="background:#fcf;"
| 51 || Feb 9 || Pittsburgh Penguins || 1–4 || New York Islanders || Nassau Veterans Memorial Coliseum || 18–28–5 || 41
|- style="background:#fcf;"
| 52 || Feb 10 || Los Angeles Kings || 4–3 || Pittsburgh Penguins || Civic Arena || 18–29–5 || 41
|- style="background:#fcf;"
| 53 || Feb 14 || Pittsburgh Penguins || 4–5 || Chicago Black Hawks || Chicago Stadium || 18–30–5 || 41
|- style="background:#fcf;"
| 54 || Feb 16 || Quebec Nordiques || 8–1 || Pittsburgh Penguins || Civic Arena || 18–31–5 || 41
|- style="background:#fcf;"
| 55 || Feb 18 || Pittsburgh Penguins || 2–8 || Philadelphia Flyers || The Spectrum || 18–32–5 || 41
|- style="background:#cfc;"
| 56 || Feb 20 || Calgary Flames || 3–6 || Pittsburgh Penguins || Civic Arena || 19–32–5 || 43
|- style="background:#fcf;"
| 57 || Feb 22 || New York Rangers || 8–3 || Pittsburgh Penguins || Civic Arena || 19–33–5 || 43
|- style="background:#cfc;"
| 58 || Feb 23 || Pittsburgh Penguins || 3–1 || Minnesota North Stars || Met Center || 20–33–5 || 45
|- style="background:#fcf;"
| 59 || Feb 25 || Minnesota North Stars || 5–4 || Pittsburgh Penguins || Civic Arena || 20–34–5 || 45
|- style="background:#fcf;"
| 60 || Feb 27 || Winnipeg Jets || 6–4 || Pittsburgh Penguins || Civic Arena || 20–35–5 || 45
|-

|- style="background:#cfc;"
| 61 || Mar 2 || New York Rangers || 4–5 || Pittsburgh Penguins || Civic Arena || 21–35–5 || 47
|- style="background:#fcf;"
| 62 || Mar 3 || Pittsburgh Penguins || 3–7 || New York Rangers || Madison Square Garden (IV) || 21–36–5 || 47
|- style="background:#fcf;"
| 63 || Mar 5 || Pittsburgh Penguins || 0–6 || Los Angeles Kings || The Forum || 21–37–5 || 47
|- style="background:#fcf;"
| 64 || Mar 7 || Pittsburgh Penguins || 1–5 || St. Louis Blues || St. Louis Arena || 21–38–5 || 47
|- style="background:#cfc;"
| 65 || Mar 9 || Pittsburgh Penguins || 6–5 OT || Boston Bruins || Boston Garden || 22–38–5 || 49
|- style="background:#fcf;"
| 66 || Mar 10 || Pittsburgh Penguins || 4–11 || Philadelphia Flyers || The Spectrum || 22–39–5 || 49
|- style="background:#fcf;"
| 67 || Mar 13 || Boston Bruins || 7–3 || Pittsburgh Penguins || Civic Arena || 22–40–5 || 49
|- style="background:#cfc;"
| 68 || Mar 16 || New York Rangers || 0–5 || Pittsburgh Penguins || Civic Arena || 23–40–5 || 51
|- style="background:#fcf;"
| 69 || Mar 17 || Pittsburgh Penguins || 3–4 || Hartford Whalers || Hartford Civic Center || 23–41–5 || 51
|- style="background:#fcf;"
| 70 || Mar 19 || Philadelphia Flyers || 5–3 || Pittsburgh Penguins || Civic Arena || 23–42–5 || 51
|- style="background:#fcf;"
| 71 || Mar 22 || Pittsburgh Penguins || 1–3 || Buffalo Sabres || Buffalo Memorial Auditorium || 23–43–5 || 51
|- style="background:#fcf;"
| 72 || Mar 24 || Pittsburgh Penguins || 3–7 || Washington Capitals || Capital Centre || 23–44–5 || 51
|- style="background:#fcf;"
| 73 || Mar 26 || Pittsburgh Penguins || 4–5 || New York Rangers || Madison Square Garden (IV) || 23–45–5 || 51
|- style="background:#cfc;"
| 74 || Mar 27 || New Jersey Devils || 3–4 || Pittsburgh Penguins || Civic Arena || 24–45–5 || 53
|- style="background:#fcf;"
| 75 || Mar 30 || Pittsburgh Penguins || 4–6 || New Jersey Devils || Brendan Byrne Arena || 24–46–5 || 53
|- style="background:#fcf;"
| 76 || Mar 31 || Montreal Canadiens || 4–2 || Pittsburgh Penguins || Civic Arena || 24–47–5 || 53
|-

|- style="background:#fcf;"
| 77 || Apr 2 || Pittsburgh Penguins || 3–4 || New York Islanders || Nassau Veterans Memorial Coliseum || 24–48–5 || 53
|- style="background:#fcf;"
| 78 || Apr 3 || Detroit Red Wings || 3–2 || Pittsburgh Penguins || Civic Arena || 24–49–5 || 53
|- style="background:#fcf;"
| 79 || Apr 6 || Washington Capitals || 7–4 || Pittsburgh Penguins || Civic Arena || 24–50–5 || 53
|- style="background:#fcf;"
| 80 || Apr 7 || Pittsburgh Penguins || 3–7 || Washington Capitals || Capital Centre || 24–51–5 || 53
|-

|- style="text-align:center;"
| Legend:       = Win       = Loss       = Tie

Playoffs
The Penguins failed to qualify for the playoffs for the third consecutive year, and finished in last again as well.

Player statistics
Skaters

Goaltenders

†Denotes player spent time with another team before joining the Penguins.  Stats reflect time with the Penguins only.
‡Denotes player was traded mid-season.  Stats reflect time with the Penguins only.

Awards and records
 Mario Lemieux established a new franchise rookie record for goals (43), assists (57) and points (100).  He topped the previous highs held by Pierre Larouche (37 assists, 68 points) and Mike Bullard (36 goals).
 Rick Kehoe established a career franchise record for points (636). He had led the category since 1984.
 Mario Lemieux, Calder Memorial Trophy
 Mario Lemieux, NHL All-Rookie Team
 Warren Young, NHL All-Rookie Team

Transactions

The Penguins were involved in the following transactions during the 1984–85 season:

Trades

Additions and subtractions

Draft picks 

The 1984 NHL Entry Draft was held on June 9, 1984, in Montreal, Quebec.

References
 Player stats on Hockey Database
 Game log on NHL Reference

Notes

Pittsburgh Penguins seasons
Pittsburgh
Pittsburgh
Pitts
Pitts